Xanthoxin is an intermediate in the biosynthesis of the plant hormone abscisic acid.

References

Aldehydes
Carotenoids
Epoxides